Casino Niagara is a commercial casino located in Niagara Falls, Ontario, Canada. It opened on December 9, 1996, on the site of the former Maple Leaf Village amusement park. With a prime location beside Clifton Hill, it was originally conceived as a temporary facility until Niagara Fallsview Casino Resort opened but has remained open as a permanent facility. It is the second Casino to open in Ontario, and the first to feature electronic Roulette. Casino Niagara has over 1,300 slots and over 40 table games, as well as sports betting. Apart from the pandemic, the casino has operated for 25 years.

Ownership and management
The Casino is owned by the Ontario Lottery and Gaming Corporation. As of June 2019, the casino's day-to-day operations are managed by Mohegan Gaming and Entertainment, owner of Mohegan Sun.

The Casino completed a $7 million renovation in 2017.

Facts and figures
Casino floor size: 95,000 ft² (8,800 m²)
Slot machines: 1300
Slot tournament area
Table games: more than 40
Poker room tables: 26
Restaurants: 3 (Level 2 Bar and Restaurant, The Market Buffet, Perks Cafe)
Chill Bar and Level 2 Sports Bar
Market buffet

See also
 List of casinos in Canada
 Maid of the Mist
 Fallsview Casino
 Clifton Hill
 Skylon Tower
 Spanish Aerocar
 Casino Tower
 Sheraton on the Falls
 Crowne Plaza Niagara Falls – Fallsview

References

External links
Official website

1996 establishments in Ontario
Buildings and structures in Niagara Falls, Ontario
Casinos in Ontario
Culture of Niagara Falls, Ontario
Tourist attractions in Niagara Falls, Ontario
Casinos completed in 1996